The 1895 Kilkenny Senior Hurling Championship was the seventh staging of the Kilkenny Senior Hurling Championship since its establishment by the Kilkenny County Board.

Tullaroan won the championship after a 1-04 to 1-02 defeat of Callan in the final.

References

Kilkenny Senior Hurling Championship
Kilkenny Senior Hurling Championship